Mariusz Kruk is a Polish sprint canoer who has competed since the late 2000s. He won a bronze medal in the C-1 4 x 200 meter relay at the 2010 ICF Canoe Sprint World Championships in Poznań.

References
Men's C-1 4 x 200 m relay A final results. – accessed 22 August 2010.

Living people
Polish male canoeists
Year of birth missing (living people)
Place of birth missing (living people)
ICF Canoe Sprint World Championships medalists in Canadian